Justin Darcey Reynolds (born December 12, 1988) is an American professional basketball player who last played for the South West Slammers of the State Basketball League (SBL). He played college basketball for Texas A&M–Corpus Christi.

College career
Reynolds played four years of college basketball for Texas A&M–Corpus Christi between 2007 and 2011, where he finished Top 10 all-time in scoring, rebounds, blocks and steals. In 124 games, he made 114 starts and averaged 10.0 points, 6.3 rebounds, 1.0 assists and 1.0 steals in 25.3 minutes per game.

Professional career
Reynolds spent his first two professional seasons in Macedonia and France, with KK Torus and JA Vichy respectively. He returned to Macedonia for the 2013–14 season, joining KK MZT Skopje. However, his contract was terminated in December 2013. In March 2014, he joined Japanese team Tsukuba Robots. He continued on with Tsukuba Robots for the 2014–15 season.

On October 31, 2015, Reynolds was selected by the Texas Legends in the fourth round of the 2015 NBA Development League Draft. On February 8, 2016, he was waived by the Legends. In 14 games, he averaged 4.1 points and 2.9 rebounds per game.

In January 2017, Reynolds joined Portuguese team U.D. Oliveirense. He returned to Japan for the 2017–18 season, initially joining Passlab Yamagata Wyverns before moving to Levanga Hokkaido, where he played five games in December 2017.

In February 2018, Reynolds signed with the South West Slammers of the State Basketball League. On April 12, 2018, he parted ways with the Slammers.

References

External links
College bio
FIBA.com profile

1988 births
Living people
ABA League players
American expatriate basketball people in Australia
American expatriate basketball people in France
American expatriate basketball people in Japan
American expatriate basketball people in Portugal
American expatriate basketball people in North Macedonia
Basketball players from Texas
Centers (basketball)
Cyberdyne Ibaraki Robots players
JA Vichy players
KK MZT Skopje players
Levanga Hokkaido players
Passlab Yamagata Wyverns players
People from Pearland, Texas
Power forwards (basketball)
Sportspeople from Harris County, Texas
Texas Legends players
American men's basketball players
Pearland High School alumni